Dalin is a Swedish surname. The name frequently appears as Dahlin. Both surnames are derived from the Swedish word dal meaning valley. Notable people with the surname include:

 David G. Dalin (born 1949), Jewish American historian
 Kalle Dalin (born 1975), Swedish orienteering competitor and European champion
 Per Dalin (1936–2010), Norwegian educationalist
 Olof von Dalin (1708–1763), Swedish poet

Swedish-language surnames